Helen Hennessy Vendler (born April 30, 1933) is an American literary critic and is Porter University Professor Emerita at Harvard University.

Life and career
Helen Hennessy Vendler was born on April 30, 1933, in Boston, Massachusetts, to George Hennessy and Helen  Hennessy. She was the second of three children. Her parents encouraged her to read poems as a child. Vendler's father taught Spanish, French, and italian at a high school, while her mother had taught in a primary school before marriage. Vendler attended Emmanuel College over the Boston Girls' Latin School and Radcliffe College because her parents would not let her enroll in "secular education". She received an A. B. from Emmanuel. 

Vendler was awarded a Fulbright Fellowship, attending the Université catholique de Louvain from 1954 to 1955, for mathematics. But while traveling to the university, she decided that she would rather study English than math and the Fulbright commission allowed her to switch her focus to literature. Upon returning to the U.S., Vendler took 12 undergraduate courses in English at Boston University in a year and in 1956 entered Harvard University as a graduate student in English. The department's chair told her within a week of entry that "we don't want any women here", while Perry Miller refused her entry in a seminar he led on Herman Melville despite viewing her has his "finest student", according to The New York Times. Other Harvard professors offered her more support, notably I. A. Richards. Vendler was offered a job teaching in Harvard's English department in 1959, making her the first woman the department offered a job as an instructor. She declined. 

Vendler graduated with a Ph.D. in English and American literature the next year. She began teaching English at Cornell University in 1960, after her husband at the time, Zeno Vendler, moved teach there. She left Cornell in 1963 and spent several years at various other institutions, including a year (1963-1964) teaching at Haverford College and Swarthmore College, two years (1964-1966) as an assistant professor at Boston University, and another two (1966-1968) as full professor. Vendler spent a year as a Fulbright Lecturer at the University of Bordeaux. After this, she was Boston University's director of graduate studies in the English department from 1970 to 1975 and again from 1978 to 1979.

Vendler has been a professor of English at Harvard University since 1984; from 1981 to 1984 she taught alternating semesters at Harvard and Boston University. She has said that she retained her affiliation with BU for several years to ensure that she wasn't "some little token person" at Harvard. In 1985, Vendler was named the William R. Kenan Professor of English and American Literature and Language. From 1987 to 1992, she served as associate dean of arts and sciences. In 1990, she was appointed the A. Kingsley Porter University Professor, the first woman to hold this position. In 1992, Vendler received an honorary Litt. D. from Bates College.

Vendler delivered the 2000 Warton Lecture on English Poetry. In 2004, the National Endowment for the Humanities selected her for the Jefferson Lecture, the federal government's highest honor for achievement in the humanities. Her lecture, "The Ocean, the Bird, and the Scholar", used poems by Wallace Stevens to argue for the role of the arts (as opposed to history and philosophy) in the study of humanities. In 2006, The New York Times called Vendler "the leading poetry critic in America" and credited her work with helping "establish or secure the reputations" of poets including Jorie Graham, Seamus Heaney, and Rita Dove.

Vendler has written books on Emily Dickinson, W. B. Yeats, Wallace Stevens, John Keats, and Seamus Heaney. She is a member of the Norwegian Academy of Science and Letters, the American Academy of Arts and Sciences, and the American Philosophical Society. She has also been a judge for the Pulitzer Prize for Poetry (1974, 1976, 1978, 1986) and the National Book Award for Poetry (1972).

Personal life 
Helen Vendler was married to Zeno Vendler from 1960 to 1963; the couple had one child.

Bibliography
Yeats's Vision and the Later Plays (1963)
On Extended Wings: Wallace Stevens' Longer Poems, Harvard University Press (1969)
I. A. Richards: Essays in His Honor (1973) editor with Reuben Brower and John Hollander
The Poetry of George Herbert, Harvard University Press (1975)
Part of Nature, Part of Us: Modern American Poets, Harvard University Press (1980)
 "What We have Loved, Others Will Love" (1980)
Modern American Poets (1981)
Stevens: Poems (1982)
The Odes of John Keats, Harvard University Press (1983)
The Harvard Book of Contemporary American Poetry, Harvard University Press (1985) editor
The Faber Book of Contemporary American Poetry (1986)
Wallace Stevens: Words Chosen out of Desire, Harvard University Press (1986)
Voices and Visions: The Poet in America (1987)
The Music of What Happens: Poems, Poets, Critics, Harvard University Press (1988)
Poems by W. B. Yeats Selected and with an introduction by Helen Vendler, Arion Press (1990)
The Given and the Made: Strategies of Poetic Redefinition, Harvard University Press (1995)
Herman Melville: Selected Poems selected and with an introduction by Helen Vendler, Arion Press (1995)
John Keats, 1795–1995: With a Catalogue of the Harvard Keats Collection, Harvard University Press (1995) with Leslie A. Morris and William H. Bond
The Breaking of Style: Hopkins, Heaney, Graham, Harvard University Press (1995)
The Given and the Made: Strategies of Poetic Redefinition (1995)
Poems - Poets - Poetry: An Introduction and Anthology (1996)
Soul Says: On Recent Poetry, Harvard University Press (1996) essays
The Art of Shakespeare's Sonnets, Harvard University Press (1997)
Seamus Heaney, Harvard University Press (1998)
Anthology of Contemporary American Poetry (2003) editor
Coming of Age as a Poet: Milton, Keats, Eliot, Plath Harvard University Press(2003)
Poets Thinking: Pope, Whitman, Dickinson, Yeats, Harvard University Press (2004)
Invisible Listeners: Lyric Intimacy in Herbert, Whitman, and Ashbery (2005)
Our Secret Discipline: Yeats and Lyric Form, Harvard University Press (2007)
Last Looks, Last Books: Stevens, Plath, Lowell, Bishop, Merrill (2010)
Dickinson: Selected Poems and Commentaries' (2010)The Ocean, the Bird, and the Scholar: Essays on Poets and Poetry (2015)

Notes

External links
Invisible Listeners Book (Princeton University Press)
"The Closest Reader." (New York Times Profile)
Helen Vendler author page and archive from The New York Review of BooksVendler audio interview on the friendship and correspondence between poets Elizabeth Bishop and Robert Lowell

Recorded at the Lensic Theater in Santa Fe, New Mexico, on January 22, 2003. Audio file 1 hr 20 mins. Discussion on W. B. Yeats and poetic forms
'The Finite Furnished with the Infinite', review of Dickinson in The Oxonian Review''

1933 births
Living people
American literary critics
Members of the American Academy of Arts and Letters
Harvard University faculty
Emmanuel College (Massachusetts) alumni
Fellows of Magdalene College, Cambridge
Members of the Norwegian Academy of Science and Letters
Harvard Graduate School of Arts and Sciences alumni
Women literary critics
American women non-fiction writers
20th-century American non-fiction writers
20th-century American women writers
21st-century American non-fiction writers
21st-century American women writers
American women academics
American women critics
Members of the American Philosophical Society
Presidents of the Modern Language Association